Anerley railway station is in the London Borough of Bromley in south London. The station is operated by London Overground, with Overground and Southern trains serving the station.

The main building on the down side (which is only open weekday/Saturday mornings) replaced an original building which was on the up platform. This was in turn replaced by two shelters on the Up platform. There is a bridge connecting the two platforms. Four lines run through the station, the central pair being the Up and Down through lines. The station stands off Anerley Road (A214).

History

The station was opened originally as Anerley Bridge by the London and Croydon Railway in 1839. It was situated in a largely unpopulated area, but was built as part of an agreement with the local landowner.

According to local lore, the landowner was a Scotsman and, when asked for the landmark by which the station would be known, he replied "Mine is the annerly hoose".  The timetable of the day seems to back this up since it says "There is no place of that name".

The London and Croydon Railway amalgamated with the London and Brighton Railway to form the London, Brighton and South Coast Railway in July 1846, and the station was rebuilt during the widening of the main line during 1849–50.

During the Grouping of 1923 the station became part of the Southern Railway, and then passed on to the Southern Region of British Railways on nationalisation in 1948.

When Sectorisation was introduced in the 1980s, the station was served by Network SouthEast until the Privatisation of British Rail.

Anerley formed part of the new southward extension to the East London line that opened on 23 May 2010, making Anerley part of the London Overground network. At the same time, management of the station passed from Southern to London Overground.

Services

Off-peak, all services at Anerley are operated by London Overground using  EMUs.

The typical off-peak service in trains per hour is:

 4 tph to  via 
 4 tph to 

These services are operated using  EMUs.

Connections
London Buses routes 157, 249, 354, 358, 432 and night route N3 serve the station.

References

Sources

External links

Anerley on the London Overground map 

Railway stations in the London Borough of Bromley
Former London, Brighton and South Coast Railway stations
Railway stations in Great Britain opened in 1839
Railway stations served by London Overground
Railway stations served by Govia Thameslink Railway